Joseph Kevin Keegan  (born 14 February 1951) is an English former footballer and manager. A forward, he played for several professional clubs from 1968 to 1984. Having begun his career at Scunthorpe United, he moved to Liverpool in 1971 and then to Hamburger SV in 1977, enjoying great success at both clubs. During this period, he was a regular member of the England national team. He was twice the winner of the Ballon d'Or. After leaving Hamburg in 1980, he played for Southampton and Newcastle United. Keegan returned to football in 1992 as manager at Newcastle. He later managed Fulham and Manchester City. At all three clubs, the team won promotion as champions in his first full season there. He managed England from 1999 to 2000.

Keegan began his playing career at Scunthorpe in 1968, before Bill Shankly signed him for Liverpool where he won three First Division titles, the UEFA Cup twice, the FA Cup and, in his final season, the European Cup. Keegan gained his first England cap in 1972. He moved to Hamburg in the summer of 1977 and was named European Footballer of the Year in 1978 and 1979. Hamburg won the Bundesliga title in 1978–79 and reached the 1980 European Cup Final. Keegan moved to Southampton for two seasons at the club before a transfer to Newcastle United who were then in the Second Division in 1982. He helped Newcastle to promotion in his second season, and retired from playing in 1984, having been capped 63 times for England, scoring 21 goals.

Keegan moved into management at Newcastle in 1992, the team winning promotion as First Division champions. Newcastle finished second in the Premier League in 1995–96, after leading for most of the season. After managing Fulham for two seasons, he took charge of the England team in February 1999, but resigned in October 2000 following a 1–0 loss against Germany in qualification for the 2002 FIFA World Cup. In 2001, he became manager of Manchester City for four years until he resigned in 2005. Keegan had been out of football for almost three years when he returned to Newcastle United for a second spell as manager in January 2008, but this lasted only eight months, as he resigned on 4 September 2008 following speculation about a dispute with the club's directors.

Early years
Keegan's paternal ancestors arrived in Newcastle from Ireland. In 1909, his grandfather Frank, an inspector, heroically saved lives in the West Stanley Pit disaster. His father Joe and uncle Frank were Newcastle United fans, describing their favourite players as Hughie Gallacher and Jackie Milburn.  His father moved to Armthorpe in Doncaster to work in a colliery, where he married Doris and they had three children: Mary, who was two years Keegan's senior, Kevin, and Michael. His father never saw Keegan play for Newcastle.

Keegan was born at his aunt Nellie's house in Elm Place in Armthorpe. His aunt's house was chosen as she had electricity that made it safer for childbirth. Keegan attended St. Peter's High School in nearby Cantley.

Keegan was given his first football by his uncle Frank and his first pair of football boots by his father after he had a win on the horses. They were a second-hand pair of Winit boots bought from the former Doncaster Rovers centre forward, Ray Harrison's sports shop. Keegan played football at Hyde Park using his baby brother Michael's pushchair as a goal post. As a boy he supported Doncaster Rovers. His favourite player was Alick Jeffrey, a player, once described by Matt Busby's assistant Jimmy Murphy as the English Pelé, and once described by Jackie Milburn as "the best young player he had ever seen". As a schoolboy, Keegan had a trial for Coventry City, under manager Jimmy Hill. Despite being one of two players kept on for an extra six-week period, the club did not offer Keegan a contract, though they did offer apprenticeship terms to the right-back Brian Joy who also went on to have a 15-year career in football. Keegan also had a trial with Doncaster Rovers, arranged by his father, but when Keegan arrived, he found out he had been given the wrong information and the trial was earlier in the day and at a different place.

Keegan participated in various sports, such as cross country running, rugby, football, and even captaining his school's cricket team. He also boxed at his local club, run by the former British Heavyweight champion Bruce Woodcock. At age 15, Keegan, with two friends, completed a 50-mile run from Nottingham to Doncaster. Afterwards he claimed he would never hit a psychological brick wall again with regards to running. In his autobiography, Keegan claimed this run prepared him physically and psychologically for any running he had to do in any future pre-season training or football matches. Keegan left school with O Levels in History and Art.

At the age of 15 Keegan started work at Pegler Brass Works as an office clerk; though he has stated that he was more of a tea boy and messenger than an office clerk. Whilst working at Pegler, Keegan continued playing Saturday afternoon football for his local youth club, Enfield House, and playing Sunday morning football for the Lonsdale Hotel. It was during this time that a colleague, named Harry Holland, invited him to play for the Peglers Works reserves on a Saturday morning. His chance at professional football came when he was playing Sunday morning league football for the Lonsdale Hotel in a match against Woodfield Social in 1966. Keegan was marked by a player in his mid 30s, called Bob Nellis. After playing against Keegan, Nellis became impressed by the ability of Keegan and offered him a trial at Fourth Division side Scunthorpe United – one of just two professional sides in the division. This trial would lead to the Scunthorpe manager Ron Ashman giving Keegan his first contract in professional football.

Playing career

Scunthorpe United (1966–1971)
Scunthorpe United could not afford a set of football nets and trained on a rugby pitch at Quibell Park. They also, risking injury, had five-a-side training sessions on the Old Showground concrete car park. Still though, at Scunthorpe Keegan would take his training very seriously. Twice a week, after training, Keegan would train with a teammate named Derek Hemstead and they would train by doing weighted farmers walks up and down the cantilever stand at the Old Showground. A trait Keegan had was his running ability. In running drills at Scunthorpe Keegan liked trying to finish first and Keegan was told by Jack Brownsword that one thing he has going for him is that he is a one hundred percenter and he should never lose that. Though this will to be first in his running drills would later irritate senior pros such as Liverpool's Tommy Smith and Shankly would later advise Keegan that he did not have to win all his runs.

Scunthorpe, a club with little money, did not have a full-time driver to drive them to away games and Keegan, with other the other younger players, such as Nigel Jackson, would take turns in driving the minibus to and from away games. Young Keegan, fellow driver Nigel Jackson and fellow young professionals Jimmy Coyne, Alan Olbison and Steve Hibbotson, once borrowed coach Jack Brownsword's stop watch and had timed rallies around the Old Showground with the club's vintage tractor. On Keegan's turn the tractor crashed and the tractor's axle went through the engine. The crash was very expensive to fix and the five were given a rollicking by manager Ron Ashman. This experience gave Keegan awareness of his responsibility as a representative of Scunthorpe United. Keegan made his debut against Peterborough United at the age of 17, making 29 league starts in his first season. He became a regular in the first team by the 1969–70 season, playing all 46 league games for the club. This season saw the team reach the fifth-round of the FA Cup, beating Football League First Division side Sheffield Wednesday along the way. Keegan then missed only one game in his last season. Earning a pittance, meant Keegan each summer had to find summer jobs; and each summer he would do jobs such as plate-laying at the Appleby Frodingham Steelworks.

 Keegan played regularly in a creative right midfield role for the Scunthorpe United first team despite his age – he scored 18 goals in 124 games for the club. After his first season he started attracting interest from higher division clubs. In one rare television interview of Keegan at Scunthorpe in 1969–70, Keegan tried to play down the interest, stating: "I'm getting first-team football here. Should think if I went First Division, I'd struggle a bit." Not long after this interview, Keegan, noting other players had moved on to a higher level, began to feel impatient about moving on and Keegan even considered packing the game in and getting a full-time job if he did not get a move to a higher level. Higher division clubs such as Preston, Birmingham City, Notts County, Millwall and Arsenal all showed interest but nothing came of it.

Liverpool (1971–1977)
In 1971, he attracted the attention of Liverpool's head scout Geoff Twentyman, whose opinion was held in high regard by manager Bill Shankly. After Twentyman's recommendation, Liverpool made an offer for Keegan and this offer was accepted by Scunthorpe United. After Scunthorpe had agreed to the fee Keegan was driven the four hours to Bill Shankly's office by manager Ron Ashman who was determined to get a cash influx for Scunthorpe United. Prior to the journey Keegan's father prompted Keegan to not sell himself cheap. Keegan then haggled a contract worth £50 a week from Shankly, after Shankly had originally offered him £45. Ashman, sensing a cash windfall may fall through, was at one stage aghast at Keegan's negotiation game. On the drive back to Scunthorpe Ashman was critical of Keegan's bluff that he was almost earning £45 a week at a fourth division football club.

After the negotiation Keegan was transferred to Liverpool for £33,000 in 1971, at the age of 20.

Liverpool bought Keegan as a midfielder, but Shankly soon decided to move Keegan upfront alongside John Toshack. In a reserve match against Tranmere Rovers Keegan, playing right midfield, and after playing a game with an attacking philosophy he was strongly warned by Ronnie Moran that he was "playing too free and easy," and "nearly playing up front." At one stage Keegan took Moran's criticism on board, took the criticism as a slight, and for a period perceived that Moran strongly had it in for him. As a result of young Keegan's lack of positional discipline, Keegan was then tested upfront in a preseason reserve match against Southport. Keegan scored both goals in a 2–1 victory. This match was watched by Shankly. Liverpool then tried Keegan in attack at Melwood in a game between the first team and the reserves. Keegan played for the first team and scored 4 in a 7–0 victory. His attacking play and ability prompted manager Bill Shankly to stop playing Keegan at right midfield and instead Shankly decided Keegan would be more effective upfront. After his first preseason at Liverpool Keegan was immediately deployed as the new strike partner for Toshack.

Though Keegan did like Toshack as a teammate, Keegan never socialised with him off the pitch and Keegan maintained it was almost spooky how much they instantaneously could read each other's little and large game. In his career Keegan explained that the only player who reached that level of footballing understanding with him was England international Trevor Brooking.

On 14 August 1971, Keegan made his Liverpool debut against Nottingham Forest at Anfield, scoring after 12 minutes. Keegan made his England debut at under-23 level later in 1971. His full debut came in a World Cup qualifier against Wales at Ninian Park. Keegan's first goal for his country also came in a game against Wales in Cardiff. This time it was a British Home Championship match that England won 2–0 on 11 May 1974, his third full cap. Shankly had told Keegan he would play for England 18 month before it happened.

Early on at Liverpool, Keegan stopped acknowledging his first name Joseph on his autograph and just signed it Kevin Keegan, instead of the JK Keegan that he scribbled at Scunthorpe.

In 1972–73, Keegan won his first major honours. Don Revie's Leeds United visited Anfield on Easter Monday for a showdown involving two of the three League challengers. The game turned on a few minutes either side of half time. First Leeds' Peter Lorimer missed an open goal. Two minutes after the break Peter Cormack took his chance to put Liverpool ahead. Keegan added a late second to seal the win. With Arsenal dropping a point at Southampton, Liverpool duly closed out the title with a final game 0–0 draw against Leicester City. This was their first major trophy since 1966.

Liverpool also won the UEFA Cup. The 1973 UEFA Cup Final first leg at Anfield was abandoned due to a downpour after 27 minutes and rescheduled to be played again the next day. The 27 minutes that had been played had given Liverpool manager Bill Shankly an insight into Borussia Mönchengladbach's defensive vulnerability in the air. To exploit this he brought tall forward Toshack into the starting team demoting the smaller Brian Hall, who appeared only as a late substitute. Keegan scored two goals set up by Toshack headers in a 3–0 win. Liverpool lost 2–0 away to win 3–2 on aggregate.

The following season, Keegan was again a frequent scorer but Liverpool lost the League title to a Leeds United team that went unbeaten for a then-record 29 games at the start of the season. Liverpool, however, progressed to the FA Cup final. Their campaign in the competition had started with a tie against the club which had rejected Keegan, Doncaster Rovers, and it was Keegan who scored both Liverpool goals in a 2–2 draw. Liverpool won the replay and Keegan scored twice more on the way to Wembley Stadium, including a lob-volley over the head of England colleague Peter Shilton in the semi-final against Leicester City at Villa Park.

In the 1974 final, Liverpool played Newcastle United. Keegan explained that Shankly's motivation was made easy after the pre-game talking by Supermac (Malcolm Macdonald) and to a lesser extent John Tudor. Tudor and Keegan's friend, Macdonald, gave interviews confidently proclaiming they had more ability whilst also being critical of older Liverpool pros such as Tommy Smith. Keegan also believed Shankly may have got into the heads of the Newcastle players when on the night before the game Shankly and Joe Harvey were being interviewed and Shankly was heard on the microphone, but off-camera, stating, "Joe looks a bag of nerves..." Keegan explained, knowing Shankly it would not surprise him if this was not an accident and Shankly knew what he was doing and that this statement was meant to neutralise any of Newcastle's confidence and that this did indeed rub off into the heads of some of the Newcastle players who became anxious. In the final, Keegan scored two as Liverpool beat Newcastle United 3–0. It was the first brace in an FA Cup final since Mike Trebilcock scored twice for Everton in 1966. The game against Newcastle was Keegan's first FA Cup Final. To Keegan, with the 100,000 inside the ground, the non-stop chanting of both sets of fans, and then the millions watching on TV, this game was as close to a non drug-induced psychedelic experience as he could ever get. He noted how after this final Shankly, he and the other Liverpool players were sympathetic to the devastated Newcastle players and tried to not rub it in with their victory.

Keegan's next visit to Wembley was three months later in the Charity Shield game, the traditional curtain-raiser to a new season, between the League champions and the FA Cup winners. Leeds had decided to niggle at Liverpool, and in particular Keegan, in the match. In one instance Johnny Giles punched the unsuspecting Keegan and was reprieved after Keegan asked the referee to be lenient. Giles, after escaping a red card, then later lunged two-footed at Keegan. Upon Keegan's outraged reaction Billy Bremner challenged Keegan. Keegan then exploded and punched Bremner. Bremner punched back. They were sent off, the first time anyone had been sent off in a Charity Shield match. Both players removed their shirts in protest, with Keegan visibly shaken by the decision. Inside the Liverpool dressing room, Bremner approached Keegan to apologise and was met by the fury of Keegan's father who had come down to check on his son. They both received lengthy bans. The fight was shown that night on BBC television and both were fined £500, with Keegan being suspended for three games and Bremner eight.  Despite this, Keegan, Bremner and Giles remained good friends outside of football.

The next year saw Keegan scoring goals and representing his club and country, but 1974–75 was a trophyless season for Liverpool and England failed to qualify for the European Championships. There were numerous honours for Keegan over the next two years, however, as Liverpool again won the League championship and UEFA Cup in 1975–76. Keegan scored in both legs of the UEFA Cup final against FC Bruges, having only scored once previously during Liverpool's run in the competition.

In 1976–77, Keegan helped Liverpool get close to an unprecedented "treble" of League championship, FA Cup and European Cup, although midway through the season he announced his intention to leave in the summer to play abroad. Nevertheless, Keegan was irrepressible as Liverpool clinched the title and reached the finals of both Cup competitions. Keegan's last appearance in a Liverpool shirt on home soil saw Liverpool lose the FA Cup final to bitter rivals Manchester United, ending the possibility of the treble. The European Cup final in Rome against Borussia Mönchengladbach was four days later. Keegan did not score, but he did make a late run which led to a foul inside the penalty area by Berti Vogts. This led to a penalty which was successfully converted by Phil Neal, sealing a 3–1 win. In this season, on 4 December 1976, Keegan's father, who had been suffering from cancer, died at the age of 71.

After 323 appearances and exactly 100 goals, Keegan left Liverpool. He had been made offers from clubs across Europe, and chose to join Hamburger SV in the West German Bundesliga for £500,000. Liverpool replaced him with Kenny Dalglish. Of his time in Liverpool, Keegan later said, "The only thing I fear is missing an open goal in front of the Kop. I would die if that were to happen. When they start singing 'You'll Never Walk Alone' my eyes start to water. There have been times when I've actually been crying while I've been playing."

Hamburger SV (1977–1980)

Keegan's transfer to Hamburg was agreed between the FA Cup final and the European Cup final of 1977, although Keegan had negotiated a maximum transfer fee the season before. With the British record transfer record set by Keegan at £500,000, and Keegan almost doubling the German transfer record, Keegan arrived in Germany, joining a club that had not finished higher than sixth in two decades. Keegan told ITV that his annual salary the last season he played for Liverpool was £22,000 whereas at Hamburg it was £122,000. 

Following his move to Hamburg, Keegan became an early trendsetter with his new haircut, the perm. On first sight, his wife thought it was hilarious and his agent jokingly tried to disown him in public. Soon though, players such as Bryan Robson, Charlie George, Phil Neal, Terry McDermott also had 1980s perms. Later, when Keegan was at Newcastle United as a manager, he and Terry McDermott would joke about the perm on a national kit supplier advert. Keegan, who was Hamburg's best-paid player and had been intensely billed as the superstar signing from England who would transform an average German team by the club's business manager Dr Peter Krohn, was not immediately accepted by his new teammates. Keegan perceived things that highlighted he was not immediately accepted. In training he would not receive the ball after he made a run.

Rules also stated that no club was allowed more than two foreign players, and unknowingly to Keegan he had also upset some of his new teammates as his move had indirectly moved out the three times European Cup winner Horst Blankenburg. Blankenburg was a very popular member of the squad. There was also a belief and a resentment amongst the players that the previous coach, who the players liked and did not think needed replacing, was replaced by Krohn, to accommodate Keegan. It was not until Keegan had moved out of temporary accommodation and moved to a bungalow in the little village of Itzstedt that Keegan began to feel he could make inroads and make a go of football and life in Germany.

In one early interview Keegan mentioned how he was settling in. He explained how he missed British cereals that he could not find in the supermarkets in Germany. The Hamburg fans then flooded him with parcels of his favourite cereal with lists of the suppliers. There were language difficulties early on. In one instance in the summer, Keegan went into a hardware shop intending to buy a fuse and he eventually left the shop after buying Christmas lights.

He scored in pre-season friendlies against Barcelona and former club Liverpool, but the club suffered defeat in the European Super Cup against the Merseysiders. Keegan's time in Hamburg got off to a bad start. Keegan's first league match was against Duisburg and Hamburg lost 5–2. Rudi Gutendorf, the manager some believe was appointed for Keegan, would last until October.

In the winter break of his first season, and being isolated by the clique in the dressing room, frustrated Keegan was sent off in a friendly against lower league club VfB Lübeck. A player in the match decided to target Keegan. After the third time being smashed, Keegan walked to the goading Lübeck player and punched him. Keegan who knew he was going to be sent off, walked off the pitch prior to any decision by the referee. Keegan maintains this was the lowest ebb of his time in Germany and following this moment Keegan then decided to master the German language and be in a position to fully integrate in order to be in a strong position to ask the players why they were not passing to him, and to show the players in the training ground café, he too loved the club.

Keegan was suspended for 8 weeks and in those 8 weeks Keegan and the squad made efforts to integrate. Keegan knew the dressing room was turning, when he was getting invited to the squad nights out, when one player told him he could get cheap meat for his dogs and when the full back Peter Hidien even got a perm. An unhappy first few months at the club gave way to a more successful season. Although the club finished tenth in the league in 1977–78, Keegan's 12 goals helped him pick up a personal honour, the France Football European Footballer of the Year award for 1978.

Hamburg appointed Branko Zebec, a Yugoslav, as a new coach. Zebec was a man who was known to work players to the max. Zebec's squad did a lot of running and Keegan claimed he had never been worked as hard in his life. The 1978–79 season saw a vast improvement on the club's 1978 finish. With new manager Branko Zebec imposing a tough training regime, and Keegan's increasing grasp of the German language, coupled with the newly imposed discipline meant that Hamburg finished as league champions for the first time in nineteen years. The club's success also translated into individual recognition for Keegan, who picked up the European Footballer of the Year award for a second consecutive year at the club. The European Footballer of the Year award had been running since 1956 and by 1979 only Keegan, Alfredo di Stefano, Franz Beckenbauer and Johan Cruyff had won the award two or more times. By 2017 Keegan was amongst ten players who had won the award two or more times since 1956. After the 1978–79 season, Juventus, Real Madrid and the Washington Diplomats tried to sign Keegan offering good terms, but Keegan decided to see out his contract at Hamburg and to try and win the European Cup. In 1979 Keegan was given the nickname Mighty Mouse from the Hamburg fans. This nickname came from a popular cartoon superhero from the 1970s and 1980s.

After training Keegan would be exhausted, and only have enough energy to sleep. In February in the 1979–80 season, Keegan announced he was leaving after his contract was up. One of the reasons for leaving was Zebec's training regime. Keegan had a lot of respect for Zebec, though Keegan also reasoned that Zebec's extreme fitness regime philosophy was flawed for the modern-day footballer. Keegan even told Zebec that his training regime would burn himself out as a footballer and that he believed he would be finished from playing by 30 if he continued. Zebec, in turn responded to Keegan's critique and explained to Keegan it was the same for all the players. Keegan then implied to Zebec that players have different roles and not all players run the same distances on match days; he pointed out to Zebec that because of his role and his effort, on match days not many players in the squad ran as much as himself. At Hamburg Keegan even doodled with a pen and paper what he thought of the training regime. Keegan, as the metaphorical prisoner, drew a cartoon picture of Zebec in sunglasses, with he and his teammates doing press-ups, and then scribed Roman numerals conveying Keegan was counting down to his freedom. These drawings were left in his training ground locker. The drawings and Keegan's personal locker are now held in the Hamburg museum under the title 'HSV Legenden'

Hamburg's European campaign of 1979–80 saw Keegan score two goals to help Hamburg past Dinamo Tbilisi, Soviet champions who had beaten Liverpool to reach the latter stages. On the run Hamburg beat, Dinamo Tbilisi, Valur, Hajduk Split and Real Madrid. In the first leg against Real Madrid they were comfortably beaten 2-0 and most football pundits then predicted Hamburg were probably out. Hamburg then upset the apple-cart by winning the return leg 5–1. Keegan regarded this as one of the most outstanding team performances he had the fortune to be a part of. In the final they played Nottingham Forest. Forest played with 11 men behind the ball, and won the game 1–0 with a goal from John Robertson. This cup final defeat was coupled domestically with being beaten to the Bundesliga title by Bayern Munich. Having negotiated a maximum transfer fee of £500,000 in his contract the year before and agreeing to a move in February, Keegan left Hamburg for Southampton in the summer of 1980.

Southampton (1980–1982)
On 11 February 1980, Lawrie McMenemy called a press conference at the Potters Heron hotel, Ampfield to announce that the European Footballer of the Year would be joining Southampton in the forthcoming summer. The news caused surprise throughout the world of football and around the city of Southampton, as Southampton were a relatively small club. The club were beginning to become established in the top division, but this signing showed how persuasive their manager could be, especially when Keegan captained England in the 1980 European Championships in Italy.

Keegan had a clause inserted into his contract when he joined Hamburg in 1977, giving Liverpool the option to buy him back. Liverpool, however, opted not to exercise this clause when he returned to England three years later. As late as November 2011, Keegan has stated, "I was with Lawrie [McMenemy] at a charity event the other day, and he said he phoned up Peter Robinson because he wanted me, but Liverpool had a clause. Peter said, 'No, we won't be signing him, definitely, we don't need him.'" It was, therefore, Southampton boss Lawrie McMenemy who snapped him up for £420,000, and Keegan made his Southampton debut at Lansdowne Road in a pre-season friendly against Shamrock Rovers on 23 July 1980.

Keegan's two seasons at The Dell saw him as part of a flamboyant team also containing Alan Ball, Phil Boyer, Mick Channon and Charlie George. In 1980–81 Saints scored 76 goals, finishing in sixth place, then their highest league finish.

In the following season, Keegan was able to produce some of his best form and at the beginning of April 1982 Southampton sat at the top of the First Division table, but a run of only three wins from the end of February meant a seventh-place finish, 21 points off 1st place. Despite this, Keegan was voted the PFA Player of the Year and awarded the OBE for services to Association Football. Keegan had scored 26 of the team's 72 goals and was voted the club's Player of the Year. This second season was the most prolific of his career and he, in total scored 30 goals and he won the golden boot.

Keegan had fallen out with McMenemy over the manager's failure to strengthen Southampton's defence (which conceded 67 goals in 1981–82) while the team was at the top of the table. There were also rumours that McMenemy had charged the whole team of cheating after a 3–0 defeat by Aston Villa in April 1982 to which Keegan took great exception. Although Keegan joined Saints' next pre–season tour, he had already decided to move. In 2019 Lawrie McMenemy explained that prior to the start of the 1982–83 season, Keegan believed that Southampton did not match his footballing ambitions and therefore Keegan had made up his mind and demanded to leave, and there was nothing the club could do about it. A few days before the start of the 1982–83 season he signed for Newcastle United for a fee of £100,000.

Newcastle United (1982–1984)
Keegan joined Newcastle United and spent two seasons there, during which time he was extremely popular with the supporters. Keegan's first press conference, to announce his signing, was held in the Gosforth Park Hotel. Upon signing the twice European footballer of the year in the second division, a local newspaper's main headline was simply, 'Here he is!'

Keegan always felt at one stage in his career he would play for Newcastle United. As a child Keegan's father would tell him football stories about Milburn and Gallagher. Keegan explained his father would have loved Keegan playing football in black and white stripes, and to Keegan playing for Newcastle felt like coming home. There was euphoria in Newcastle at the signing of Keegan and Keegan felt he was there to help the fans to start believing in themselves. Keegan had never experienced that kind of deification before. Keegan explained, no one could have made him more welcome. People had warned Keegan that whatever he was thinking his welcome would like, it would not be enough... To Keegan, who had played in a European Cup final, Wembley and Hamburg, the atmosphere on his debut was unique, explaining that the noise on his debut come from all sides of the ground like a surround-sound system. He made his debut and scored his first goal against QPR. After scoring, Keegan did something he had never done before, Keegan instinctively, and famously, threw himself into the crowd to 'show the fans he was one of them,' and explained to the press afterwards that 'I just wanted to stay there for ever...' Keegan had a fear of letting the fans down, constantly telling himself 'You can't let them down.'

Keegan at Newcastle was the senior pro. Keegan, along with Terry McDermott, Jeff Clark and David McCreery, now had a senior status. As a senior pro, his manager, Arthur Cox, who would later join many of Keegan's coaching teams when Keegan would later become a manager, had a different relationship to Keegan than with other players. Cox would ask Keegan his opinion on players.

To Keegan, Cox was a task master, with a good sense of humour. Cox would condition the players like commandos by having Keegan and his teammates running up and down the hills in Gateshead.

In his first season Newcastle finished fifth. and Keegan maintained that after a faltering season, this position was a flattering league position. Keegan, finished this season with 21 goals in 37 appearances and won North East Player of the Year.

In September 1983, Keegan answered a phone call at 1:00 am from Arthur Cox. In the phone call Cox explained to Keegan, sharply, he had signed a player called Peter Beardsley from Vancouver Whitecaps and explained to Keegan that he'd like him; after giving Keegan the message, Cox immediately put the phone down... A few days later Keegan met Beardsley at Benwell. Keegan and his teammates, at first sight, thought Beardsley was just a lad who had won the competition to train with the first team. It was only when they saw him in action that they knew he had something about him. At Beardsley's first training session Keegan could not believe his eyes at what a talent he was witnessing. Keegan once stated about Beardsley, "At Scunthorpe I always thought Terry Heath had the wow factor, because of his skill on the ball, and when I moved to Liverpool I had never seen anyone with Peter Thompson's ability. By the time I started playing for Newcastle, however, I had played against Cruyff, Maradona and Pelé, and yet I have never had my mind blown as I did on the first day I saw Peter Beardsley."

Keegan announced his retirement prior to the end of the 1983–84 season, on 14 February 1984 - his 33rd birthday. Keegan felt his career was finished after a cup game, a month prior, away at Liverpool. In this match Keegan was put through on goal from a through ball. This through ball had caught all the defenders flat-footed, left the defenders out of the equation, and left Keegan one on one with the keeper Bruce Grobbelaar. Keegan thought this was his moment to put Newcastle 1-0 up in front of the thousands of Newcastle fans behind the goal. Keegan who had been in a one on one with the goal keeper many times in training, and in football matches, felt, with his pace, with his experience in this position, it was second nature to finish the move. Keegan though was intercepted by the recovering Mark Lawrenson. As Keegan was moving towards goal with his pace, Lawrenson caught up to Keegan and stole the ball off him from the side. At this precise moment, it occurred to Keegan he had now lost his yard of pace. At the end of the game a frustrated Keegan, whilst clapping off the fans, had decided this would be his last season as a footballer.

Keegan felt if he had have extended his career at Newcastle in the first division he would have had to adjust his game and move from the attacking role he had built his footballing identity on over the last 15 years of his career. Keegan did not want to extend his career by moving back into midfield in the first division with Newcastle. He wanted to retire on a high at Newcastle United.

Keegan's last league game was against Brighton & Hove Albion, scoring in a 3–1 victory. He played 78 times, he was prolific and he scored 48 goals and helped them to promotion from the Second Division in 1984, within a team which also contained Peter Beardsley, Chris Waddle and Terry McDermott. His final appearance for Newcastle came in a friendly against Liverpool some days later, leaving the pitch in a helicopter while still dressed in his kit. Famously, a then unknown 13-year-old Alan Shearer, who Keegan would later break the world transfer record for, whilst manager of Newcastle, was a ball boy in Keegan's testimonial. Keegan would also famously rule out football management.

Keegan moved with his family to Spain. Keegan, who had stated that he would never enter football management, did carry out occasional work as a football pundit for British television.

Blacktown City (1985)
In April 1985, Keegan briefly came out of retirement to play a two-game stint as a guest player for Blacktown City in Australia's National Soccer League. He scored in the first fixture in a 3–2 loss to Canberra City.

International career

Keegan made his England debut on 15 November 1972 in a 1–0 World Cup qualifying win over Wales. Keegan appeared in only the two matches against Wales during this campaign as England failed to qualify for the 1974 FIFA World Cup.

He scored his first international goal in his third appearance, also against Wales, on 11 May 1974. He was given the captaincy by manager Don Revie in 1976 after Gerry Francis fell victim to a long-term injury. He went on to captain England 31 times, retaining the captain's armband until his international retirement after the 1982 World Cup.

Keegan captained England at Euro 1980. England failed to progress from the group stage after finishing third in their group behind Italy and Belgium.

He managed only one World Cup appearance though, after England failed to qualify for both the 1974 and 1978 tournaments. He finally reached a World Cup in 1982 when England got to the finals in Spain. He was named in the squad for the tournament, but was suffering from a chronic back injury and was unfit to play in all of England's group games. In a last, desperate effort to play in a World Cup (he knew that he would not be around for the 1986 competition) he secretly hired a car and drove from Spain to a specialist he knew in Germany for intensive treatment. He recovered sufficiently to appear as a substitute for the last 26 minutes of England's final second-round game against hosts Spain. During this time he missed a point-blank header which would have broken the deadlock, in a game England needed to win by a better scoreline than 2–1 to progress to the semi-finals (a 2–1 victory would have left them tied with West Germany). England drew the game 0–0 and were eliminated from the competition.

Following the successful start to the 1982–83 season with Newcastle United, there was much controversy when newly appointed England manager Bobby Robson did not select Keegan for his first squad, a decision Keegan learned of from the media rather than Robson himself. Keegan publicly expressed his displeasure at not being given the courtesy of a phone call from Robson, and never played for his country again. He had won a total of 63 caps and scored 21 goals.

Managerial career

Newcastle United
On 5 February 1992, almost eight years after his final game as a player, Keegan returned to football as manager of Newcastle United. They had been relegated from the top flight in 1989 and narrowly missed out on promotion in 1990 after losing in the playoffs to arch-rivals Sunderland, but in 1991 they had failed to make the playoffs and at several stages in 1991–92, they had temporarily occupied bottom place in the Second Division. Following the dismissal of previous manager Ossie Ardiles, Keegan was appointed to prevent Newcastle from being relegated to the third tier of English football for the first time. Keegan joined a club that still had participants from the old board room battles that had been going on at the club for decades. It has been argued the internal struggles from the former regime had held the club back. After three or more years trying, John Hall had recently won the board room from the old regime. Though John Hall was not yet confirmed as the chairman he had accrued enough power to make the key decisions. The board members belonging to the former regime were only told by John Hall, one hour before Keegan's first press conference that Kevin Keegan would be the manager. Keegan had only watched two live matches in seven years. One was the European Cup final in 1991 and the other being a Newcastle United 0–0 draw against Blackburn; as such, calls were made that suggested Keegan was unprepared and inexperienced.

When Keegan turned up to Benwell for his first training session as manager, he noted the training ground was in a mess. Keegan was surprised at the timely neglect of the training ground facilities. The training ground was in the process of being sold, despite this, Keegan paid for the clean up of the training ground with his own money, with the cleaning work being done in one weekend. Keegan felt this clean up work was an important move and an indirect statement to the players that conveyed to the players that their professionalism, from now on, had to be high. Assessing the squad, Keegan opined that the squad was not good enough to reach the level he and McDermott once played at. In five-a-sides he and Terry McDermott, both in their 40s, with their lack of conditioning, believed they were two of the stand out players. Keegan noted the club had an impressive crop of youth players. This crop included: Lee Clark, Steve Watson, Steve Howey, Alan Thompson and Robbie Elliott. These young players would form a core of players involved in Keegan's Newcastle squads from 1992 to 1997. Keegan noted Steve Watson would take throw-ins via a somersault throw and this amused and shocked Keegan. Keegan regarded it as a gimmick and he could not believe the fans would take joy in it. The throw-in, to Keegan, was a sign of how far Newcastle had fallen. Keegan wanted the club to be known for scoring goals and thrilling football. Prior to his first game, Keegan made his first tough call with his squad of players when he dropped the midfielder Lee Clark. Though he liked Clark's spirit, Keegan believed he was at risk of being sent off. Prior to the game Keegan arranged a training match for the reserves and included himself to make up the numbers. In the training match a frustrated Clark went through the back of Keegan in a knee high tackle, following a hospital pass, in a similar way that Romeo Benetti went into the back of Keegan in an England versus Italy match. The melee resulted in Pavel Srnicek swinging a roundhouse kick at Lee Clark's head. Keegan was not upset and he did not punish either player. To Keegan, Srnicek and Clark's response showed they cared about their football. Keegan's first game, against Bristol City, ended in 3–0 victory in front of a capacity crowd.

On 14 March 1992, following a 3–1 win over Swindon Town, Keegan had become frustrated with Chairman John Hall. Keegan perceived he had not given the transfer funds he had been promised. As a result of this frustration, Keegan briefly walked out of the Newcastle job. This resulted in a phone call between Keegan and Hall, where they settled their differences and where Hall guaranteed Keegan millions of pounds to spend on new players.
Further assessing his squad, Keegan noted some players could not handle the pressure and would sneak in by a turnstile rather than meet and greet the big crowds at the front entrance prior to games. Keegan decided to move these players on. With the club's transfer funds Keegan decided he needed a leader in the team, someone with a wild look about him, a look that meant business. Keegan signed the experienced Brian Kilcline. Keegan stated about Kilcline, "Even on his bad days his head never dropped, he was tough as teak, absolutely fearless" and "He was a ready-made captain - one of my more important signings as Newcastle's manager." Keegan's managerial guidance in the 1991–92 season helped secure survival, which meant Newcastle United would play in the new Division One for the 1992–93 season.

Prior to the 1992–93 season, Keegan strengthened the defence with the acquisition of Barry Venison from Liverpool and John Beresford from Portsmouth, while striker David Kelly had arrived on Tyneside a few months before Keegan was appointed. Newcastle began the season with 11 successive wins and led the league virtually all season, and the club record signing of Bristol City striker Andy Cole in February further strengthened their side; Cole netted 12 goals in his first 12 games for the club. The addition of Charlton Athletic's Rob Lee bolstered the midfield in the autumn.

Newcastle were promoted to the Premier League as Division One champions.

Top scorer David Kelly and influential midfielder Gavin Peacock were both sold during the close season, and Keegan brought striker Peter Beardsley back to Newcastle from Everton, six years after he had been sold by Newcastle to Liverpool.

1993–94 was an enormous success for Newcastle as they finished third in the Premier League and qualified for the UEFA Cup, bringing European football to the club for the first time since the 1970s. Andy Cole was the Premier League's top scorer with 34 goals from 40 games, and managed a club record total of 41 goals in all competitions.

Keegan then strengthened his side by signing Swiss World Cup defender Marc Hottiger and Belgium's defensive midfielder Philippe Albert, while Norwich City's quick winger Ruel Fox had arrived on transfer deadline day in March 1994.

Newcastle won their first six games of the 1994–95 season to top the league and they appeared capable of winning their first league title since 1927. But the shock departure of Andy Cole to Manchester United in January weakened their attack, and finished the season sixth place in the final table; not enough for even another UEFA Cup campaign. In the meantime, autumn signing Paul Kitson partnered Beardsley in attack.

Keegan made several important additions to the Newcastle side in the summer of 1995: Reading goalkeeper Shaka Hislop, Paris Saint-Germain's French winger David Ginola, Queens Park Rangers striker Les Ferdinand and Wimbledon defender Warren Barton. Ferdinand was Newcastle's biggest signing at £6 million, while the £4 million paid for Barton was the highest fee paid for a defender in English football at the time.

Newcastle excelled in the first half of the 1995–96 season, going ten points ahead on 23 December 1995 and holding a 12-point lead from early in January to 4 February. After a 2–0 defeat at West Ham United on 21 February, the lead was cut to nine points. A 1–0 defeat at the hands of fellow title challengers Manchester United cut the gap to a single point on 4 March, and within two weeks Newcastle's lead was overhauled and they were unable to recover it. Newcastle's 4–3 defeat to Liverpool on 3 April is widely considered to be one of the classic Premier League games. With two games remaining Newcastle and Manchester United both had 76 points. Newcastle only got one point in a 1–1 drawn match against Nottingham Forest on 2 May, and with a 1–1 draw for Newcastle against Tottenham Hotspur on the final day of the season on 5 May, the title was won by Manchester United, whose 3–0 triumph at Middlesbrough would have won them the title regardless of Newcastle's result against Tottenham. Keegan stated in 2018 that if Newcastle United had won the title in that season, the squad, which included players such as Les Ferdinand, Darren Peacock, David Ginola, Peter Beardsley, Faustino Asprilla and Rob Lee would have stayed together, may have built up a momentum, and won more trophies.

During the race for the 1995–96 title, Keegan directed remarks at the Manchester United manager, Sir Alex Ferguson, during a post-match interview live on Sky Sports. His outburst – "I would love it if we beat them! Love it!" – is frequently referred to when describing the relationship between the pair. In April 2003, it was named as Quote of the Decade in the Premier League 10 Seasons Awards and Most Memorable Quote in the 20 Seasons Awards in May 2012. It also appeared in Channel 4's 100 Greatest Sporting Moments.

Keegan then broke the world transfer fee record by signing Blackburn Rovers and England striker Alan Shearer in July 1996. Shearer, who had been the Premier League's top scorer in the last two seasons, was born in Newcastle and had grown up as a fan of the club. Shearer made an instant impact on his native Tyneside, despite being on the losing side on his debut, a 4–0 FA Charity Shield defeat at the hands of Manchester United, and scored two months later in a 5–0 victory against United in the Premier League. Newcastle briefly topped the league at several stages in the first half of the season and Shearer led the league scoring 25 goals.

On 8 January 1997, Keegan announced his resignation as manager. A club statement following his resignation read:

Newcastle United Football Club today announce the resignation of manager Kevin Keegan. Kevin informed the board of his wish to resign at the end of the season, having decided he no longer wishes to continue in football management at this stage in his life. Following lengthy discussions of which the board attempted to persuade Kevin to change his mind, both parties eventually agreed that the best route forward was for the club to, reluctantly, accept his resignation with immediate effect.

Keegan left the club with a short statement reading:It was my decision and my decision alone to resign. I feel I have taken the club as far as I can, and that it would be in the best interests of all concerned if I resigned now. I wish the club and everyone concerned with it all the best for the future.

On the Newcastle United DVD Magpie Magic, it is said that Chairman John Hall asked for a long-term commitment as manager from him which he was unwilling to give, while it also states that many still rumour that the pressure and criticism of selling Andy Cole and the failed title challenge in 1995–96 took its toll on him.

He was succeeded by Kenny Dalglish, the same man who had replaced him as a player at Liverpool 20 years earlier, but Newcastle were unable to win the title and finished second place in the same season, and in the following season finished outside the top ten in the Premier League, although they were FA Cup runners-up. They did not return to the top five of the Premier League until the 2001–02 season, when they finished fourth under Sir Bobby Robson.

It was during this period that Keegan gained the nickname "King Kev" from Newcastle fans.

Fulham
Keegan returned to football on 25 September 1997 as "chief operating officer" (a similar role to a director of football) at Division Two club Fulham, with Ray Wilkins as head coach. Fulham finished sixth in the final table, but Wilkins was sacked just before the first leg of the playoff semi-final and Keegan took over as manager.

His appointment came a few months after the takeover of the club by Harrods owner Mohamed Al-Fayed, who gave Keegan £10 million to spend on players that season as the first part of a £40 million attempt to deliver Premier League football to the Craven Cottage club, who had been outside the top flight since 1968 and had not even played in the league's second tier since 1986.

Keegan was unable to inspire Fulham to overcome Grimsby Town in the playoffs, but good form in 1998–99 – helped by the acquisition of more players who would normally have been signed by Premier League or Division one clubs – clinched them the Division Two title and promotion to Division One, but Keegan left at the end of the season to concentrate on his duties as England manager, having succeeded Glenn Hoddle in February 1999.

Fulham replaced Keegan with Paul Bracewell and reached the Premier League two years later under Bracewell's successor Jean Tigana, with a squad still featuring many of the players bought by Keegan or Wilkins.

England

After weeks of speculation, Keegan was named as the new England manager on 18 February 1999, succeeding Glenn Hoddle, who had been sacked two weeks earlier following a newspaper interview in which he suggested that disabled people were being punished for their sins in a previous life. He led the team to a winning start with 3–1 victory over Poland to reignite England's campaign to qualify for Euro 2000 in Group 5.  However, points dropped in draws against Sweden, Bulgaria and in the return fixture against Poland left England facing elimination as they sat out the last round of matches.  Fortunately however for England and Keegan, Poland lost their last match in Sweden in Group 5, and England instead entered the qualification playoff with Scotland. Two goals from Paul Scholes gave them a 2–0 win in the first leg, and despite a 1–0 defeat in the second leg, they qualified for the championships for the fourth tournament in succession (though on the third occasion, they had qualified automatically as hosts).

After goodwill following this success, Keegan however began to come under fire for his perceived tactical naivety. This came to a head during the unsuccessful Euro 2000 campaign, which began with a 3–2 defeat against Portugal, despite England having taken a 2–0 lead after 17 minutes. A 1–0 win in the next game over Germany, the first English victory over Germany in a competitive match since 1966, helped to eliminate their opposition (the defending champions), but in the final group game against Romania, England once again lost 3–2, this time after taking a 2–1 lead, and their hopes of reaching the quarter-finals were over.

Keegan resigned as England manager on 7 October 2000, after England lost to a Dietmar Hamann goal for Germany in their first 2002 World Cup qualifier, in the last game to be played at Wembley Stadium, before the old stadium was rebuilt. Keegan won only 38.9% of his games in charge, the lowest such percentage of any permanent England manager – although unlike Don Revie (1974–1977) or Steve McClaren (2006–2007), Keegan achieved qualification to a major tournament for England.

When Sven-Göran Eriksson became England manager, Eriksson appointed the 64-year-old Tord Grip as his assistant. This caused Keegan to complain that when he was England manager, the FA had told him that he could not have Arthur Cox as his assistant because at 60, Cox was too old. Keegan went on, "I wasn't allowed to bring in the people I wanted and that was wrong. Mr Eriksson was and I'm delighted for him because that's the way it should be."

Manchester City
On 24 May 2001, Keegan returned to football as successor to Joe Royle at Manchester City, who had just been relegated from the Premier League. Keegan signed experienced international players such as Stuart Pearce, Eyal Berkovic and Ali Benarbia. That season, City were promoted as Division One champions after scoring 108 league goals. Keegan was the first manager in the Premier League era to win the Division One title with two clubs.

In preparation for his second season as manager (2002–03), he signed Nicolas Anelka, Peter Schmeichel and Marc-Vivien Foé. That season saw Manchester City win against Liverpool at Anfield and take four points from Manchester United (their previous win in the Manchester derby being in September 1989), but concede five goals away to Chelsea and at home to Arsenal, securing their Premier League status comfortably by finishing ninth. Keegan also guided City into the UEFA Cup, qualifying via the UEFA Fair Play ranking.

For 2003–04, the club's first season at the new City of Manchester Stadium, Keegan added Steve McManaman, Paul Bosvelt, David Seaman and Michael Tarnat to City's squad. City started well and were fifth in the league on 5 November. However, a draw at home to Polish minnows Groclin led to their second-round elimination from the UEFA Cup, and was followed by a slump in form. City did not win again in the league until 21 February, and finished 16th in the league, although at Tottenham Hotspur in the FA Cup on 4 February 2004, despite going in at half time 3–0 behind and with ten men after Joey Barton was sent off; Keegan's team came back to win 4–3.

2004–05 brought better form for Manchester City, but Keegan agreed to leave as manager on 10 March 2005 after telling the chairman his desire to retire from football at the end of the season. The club went on to finish eighth under his successor Stuart Pearce, and only missed out on a UEFA Cup place when Robbie Fowler missed a penalty in stoppage time of a 1–1 draw with Middlesbrough on the last day of the season, with the last European place going to their opponents instead. Earlier that season, while still under Keegan's management, City beat Chelsea 1–0 which turned out to be the only defeat in the league that season for Chelsea, who ended up as Premier League champions.

After declaring his retirement from football in 2005, Keegan remained out of the media spotlight, working at the Soccer Circus football school in Glasgow. In October 2007, he indicated he was unlikely to manage again.

Return to Newcastle
Following the dismissal of manager Sam Allardyce, Keegan made a sensational, unexpected return to Newcastle United on 16 January 2008. Thousands of Newcastle United fans attended St James' Park to welcome the manager back to the club as he arrived to see the FA Cup third-round replay against Stoke City alongside owner Mike Ashley and chairman Chris Mort. He managed his first game at the club since 1997 against Bolton Wanderers on 19 January 2008. He awarded the club captaincy to Michael Owen, stating, "He's not scared to give his opinion when he's right, and he's not scared to say what he feels. He's a tremendous professional, and he trains properly every day." Keegan announced on 22 January that he and Alan Shearer held talks about the two linking up with Shearer as his assistant, but decided against the idea, leaving the door open for him to take other roles he was interested in.

Keegan's first eight games back at Newcastle passed without a win. On 22 March 2008, however, Keegan achieved the first victory of his second managerial spell, a 2–0 win against his former club Fulham. This was his first win as Newcastle manager since beating Leeds United on 1 January 1997, and he followed it up with wins over Tottenham and Sunderland, maintaining his perfect record over the club's local rivals in the Tyne-Wear derby and also putting Newcastle on top of the league's form chart. This run of good form was hugely thanks to a new 4–3–3 formation which was spearheaded by the productive strike trio of Obafemi Martins, Michael Owen and Mark Viduka. The trio scored 11 of the club's 14 goals in this run, which safely secured the club from a relegation battle. Newcastle's seven-game unbeaten run came to an end in a home defeat to Chelsea, and they finished the season in 12th place.

Having signed Argentine international winger Jonás Gutiérrez, as well as Gutiérrez's Argentina teammate and defender Fabricio Coloccini from Deportivo de La Coruña, amongst others, Newcastle began the 2008–09 season with a 1–1 draw against Manchester United at Old Trafford, having lost the previous season's fixtures 6–0 and 5–1, as well as beating Bolton 1–0 the following week and Coventry City 3–2 in the second round of the League Cup on 26 August.

Resignation and Premier League Arbitration Panel
As the 2007–08 season drew to a close, rumours of tensions between the club's directors and Keegan began to surface, as he publicly criticised the board, claiming they were not providing him the financial support necessary to break into the top four of the Premier League standings. His accusations caused bad press for owner Mike Ashley, who was already battling reports that he had lost hundreds of millions of pounds in a disastrous stock market venture.

Following the closure of the transfer window at midnight on 1 September 2008, early on in the morning the following day, various media sources reported that Keegan had either resigned from the club or had been sacked, leading to fan protests around St James' Park. The club released statements denying that he had left the club, but stated that talks were ongoing between Keegan and members of the board. On 4 September 2008, Keegan issued a statement confirming that he had resigned the same day, stating that, "... a manager must have the right to manage and that clubs should not impose upon any manager any player that he does not want." Late on Friday 12 September 2008, it was reported Keegan met owner Mike Ashley in London in an attempt to resolve their differences, but the meeting ended without a satisfactory conclusion for either party.

Richard Bevan, chief executive of the League Managers Association (LMA), stated the following month that Keegan would consider a return to the club but only if those who hold the ownership are willing to develop a structure which he is happy with. The club was also warned by the LMA on 5 September 2008 to develop a structure which would satisfy the next manager to replace Keegan to avoid a similar situation repeating itself and damaging the club's image. Following Dennis Wise's resignation as director of football at Newcastle in April 2009, many fans directed the blame of Keegan's exit at both owner Mike Ashley and Dennis Wise as a result of such a role being established and poorly used.

In December 2008, it was reported that following Ashley's decision to withdraw the sale of Newcastle United, a legal dispute in regards to Keegan's departure of the club was in place between himself and Ashley, with Keegan claiming unfair dismissal and Ashley claiming damage to his public image. In September 2009, it was reported that Keegan had met with Ashley and the Newcastle board – including former members – in a Premier League arbitration hearing for a claim of £10 million in compensation for his shock resignation. All sides agreed to the arbitration being held publicly.

Keegan's dispute with the club was resolved in October 2009. The tribunal ruled in favour of Keegan, agreeing that Newcastle had constructively dismissed him by insisting on the signing of midfielder Nacho González on loan (which was against his wishes) to replace James Milner following his move to Aston Villa and a bid for Bayern Munich's Bastian Schweinsteiger being rejected. Although Wise's signing of Spanish striker Xisco was not mentioned in the hearing, Keegan stated that this had also been a central factor in his departure.

The ruling was based around seven issues. The panel declared that Keegan had been misled to believe he had the final decision on player transfers, and was never explicitly told in writing, his contract, or word of mouth that he did not or that his role would see him essentially report to others. Given the generally understood role of a Premiership manager, the panel agreed he could reasonably expect that this was not a factor. The club's signing of González meant that they had violated his employment contract, which amounted to constructive dismissal. While González was the main issue in the panel final decision, the club's alleged mistreatment of Keegan, claiming they were in a position to sack him should he have not agreed to the terms they offered him, as well as his decision to remain at the club until 4 September instead of resigning on 1 September, allowing the club to reach a compromise, led to the panel ruling in Keegan's favour. Keegan was awarded £2 million (plus interest accrued) according to severance clauses in his contract, which the club never paid him after his departure. Claims for more were turned down on the basis that the standard contract severance clauses covered constructive dismissal, but he stated afterwards that the purpose of his claim had been to restore his reputation, and was delighted with the outcome, allowing him to move forward.

In pursuit of winning the tribunal, the club admitted to misleading the media and their fans. Several key senior staff, including Dennis Wise and Derek Llambias, had publicly claimed that Keegan had "the final word"; they claimed to the tribunal that this was not in fact the case and that their claims were just "PR". It was then revealed that Director of Football Dennis Wise asked Keegan to sign González after watching him "on YouTube". On 21 October, a subsequent meeting of the same panel found that the club should pay all legal and associated costs incurred by Keegan as a result of the tribunal. They reached this conclusion based on their view that the club's "defence on the primary liability issue was, in our view, wholly without merit".

Keegan stated after the hearing he still wants to manage in the top flight of football, and would consider returning to his position at the club, but feels the fans may be exhausted from his last tenure and would prefer him not to. In June 2013, Keegan stated he would only consider a return should owner Mike Ashley leave the club. Keegan has continued to criticise Ashley, accusing him of a lack of respect for the fans.

Following the sale of Newcastle United to the Public Investment Fund, Keegan spoke publicly at a talk-in event in Cramlington, stating his delight at Ashley's departure and excitement at the new ownership's ability to compete financially with the wealthiest football clubs in the world.

Personal life
In September 1970 Keegan met his future wife, Jean Woodhouse, on the Waltzers at Doncaster fair. They married on 23 September 1974 and have two daughters.

Keegan became renowned for his "poodle perm" hair in the 1970s, and has regularly appeared at the top of "worst hairstyles" surveys.

In early July 2008, Flybe International announced the naming of one of their new Bombardier Q400 aircraft in honour of Keegan's service to Newcastle United, both as a player and as manager. The plane was used on the regular service from Newcastle International Airport to London's Gatwick Airport.

He is known for aiding charities, including appearances at cricket matches for Lord's Taverners and Sussex Cricket Club.

Television
In 1976, Keegan competed in the BBC's television programme Superstars. Despite suffering severe cuts after crashing his bicycle, he insisted on re-racing and secured second place in the event, before going on to win that edition of the programme. He also advertised Brut aftershave alongside boxer Henry Cooper.

In 1979 Keegan and his wife, participated with ITV's "Brian Moore meets Kevin Keegan," documentary filmed over the season at the family's Hamburg home and during his personal business appearances, including in France, as an insight and rare glimpse into the life of a modern millionaire footballer, away from the pitch.

The same year, during his daughter's christening reception at a London hotel, Eamonn Andrews the presenter of This Is Your Life, appeared from within a giant cake, to surprise Keegan and his guests with his famous big red book. The TV show was broadcast on Keegan's 28th birthday, ten days later. Keegan quipped, "I'm so glad that I wore brown trousers".

He narrated the 90-minute documentary Keegan on Keegan, released via Castle Vision on VHS cassette in 1992.

In August 2009, nearly a year after his departure from Newcastle, Keegan resurfaced after being confirmed as the lead pundit on ESPN. During the course of the 2010 World Cup, Keegan featured as a pundit for ITV broadcasts. He was part of ESPN's live coverage of the 2011, 2012 and 2013 FA Cup finals with pitch-side build-up and post-match commentary.

Music
Keegan released a single in 1972 titled "It Ain't Easy". In 1979, his song "Head Over Heels in Love", written by Chris Norman and Pete Spencer, was released on 9 June, and peaked at number 31 in the UK charts, but climbed to number 10 in Germany where Keegan was based at the time, and where Norman's band Smokie was popular. He released another single, "England", on his return to England from Germany, but it failed to chart.

Incidents
In April 1991, he was attacked while sleeping in his Range Rover by the M25 at Reigate Hill in Surrey. His assailants later said in court that they needed money for a drugs debt and had no idea they were attacking Keegan.

In February 2009, Keegan had three points added to his driving licence after being caught doing 36 mph in a 30 mph zone on the A69 road in August 2008. This brought his total to 12 points and he consequently received a six-month driving ban.

Career statistics

Club

International

Scores and results list England's goal tally first, score column indicates score after each Keegan goal.

Managerial statistics

Honours

Player
Source:

Liverpool
Football League First Division: 1972–73, 1975–76, 1976–77
FA Cup: 1973–74
FA Charity Shield: 1974, 1976
European Cup: 1976–77
UEFA Cup: 1972–73, 1975–76

Hamburg
Bundesliga: 1978–79

Individual
Ballon d'Or: 1978, 1979
kicker Bundesliga Team of the Season: 1977–78, 1978–79, 1979–80
Inducted into the inaugural English Football Hall of Fame in 2002.
Named 8th on the Liverpool FC list of 100 Players who shook the Kop.
FWA Footballer of the Year: 1975–76
PFA Players' Player of the Year: 1981–82
FIFA 100
Onze d'Argent: 1976, 1980
Onze d'Or: 1977, 1979
North-East FWA Player of the Year: 1983, 1984

Manager
Newcastle United
Football League First Division: 1992–93

Fulham
Football League Second Division: 1998–99

Manchester City
Football League First Division: 2001–02

Individual
Premier League Manager of the Month: November 1993, August 1994, February 1995, August 1995, September 1995

References

Sources
Books

Magazines

External links

Player profile at LFChistory.net
Football Heroes England, Kevin Keegan part 1 at Sporting-heroes.net

Profile at londonhearts.com

1951 births
Living people
People from Armthorpe
Footballers from Doncaster
English footballers
England international footballers
England under-23 international footballers
English people of Irish descent
English football managers
Association football forwards
Scunthorpe United F.C. players
Liverpool F.C. players
Hamburger SV players
Southampton F.C. players
Newcastle United F.C. players
Blacktown City FC players
English Football League players
Bundesliga players
National Soccer League (Australia) players
First Division/Premier League top scorers
UEFA Cup winning players
Ballon d'Or winners
FIFA 100
UEFA Euro 1980 players
1982 FIFA World Cup players
English expatriate footballers
English expatriate sportspeople in West Germany
English expatriate sportspeople in Australia
Expatriate footballers in West Germany
Expatriate soccer players in Australia
Newcastle United F.C. managers
Fulham F.C. managers
England national football team managers
Manchester City F.C. managers
Premier League managers
English Football League managers
UEFA Euro 2000 managers
English Football Hall of Fame inductees
Officers of the Order of the British Empire
People named in the Panama Papers
FA Cup Final players
English autobiographers